Zeno is the common anglicised form of the name Zenon, derived from the theonym Zeus. Other forms of the given name include Zénon (French) and Zenón (Spanish). The name is popular as a masculine given name in many Western countries, and it can also be found as a surname. 

 Zeno (surname), a surname
 Zeno family, a Venetian family

Given name
Zeno Ibsen Rossi (born 2000), English footballer
Zeno Robinson, American voice actor
Zeno Roth (1956–2018), German musician

Fictional characters
 Great Demon King Zenon, leader of the demons in the manga and anime Devilman
 Overlord Zenon, antagonist from the video game Disgaea 2: Cursed Memories
 Zeno, the Yellow Dragon Warrior in the manga Akatsuki no Yona: Yona of the Dawn
 Zen'ō, the supreme god of the multiverse in the anime and manga Dragon Ball Super
 Zeno Bell, a demon that uses spells in the anime Zatch Bell
 Zeno Cosini, the protagonist of Italo Svevo's novel La Coscienza di Zeno
 Zenon Kar, character in the film Zenon: Girl of the 21st Century
 Zénon Ligre, alchemist, the protagonist of Marguerite Yourcenar's novel The Abyss
 Zenon Zogratis, antagonist and human host of a demon, of the manga  Black Clover
 Zenón Barriga y Pesado, character in the Mexican sitcom El Chavo del Ocho
 Zeno Zoldyck, a character in the manga and anime series Hunter × Hunter